Rohrbach (Ilm) station is a railway station in the town of Rohrbach, located in Bavaria, Germany. Until 2000, it was called Wolnzach Bahnhof after the larger town Wolnzach five kilometers to the East.

References

Rohrbach
Buildings and structures in Pfaffenhofen (district)